Daniela Gleue is a German sprint canoer who competed in the mid-1990s. She won five medals at the ICF Canoe Sprint World Championships with two golds (K-2 500 m: 1993, 1994), two silvers (K-2 200 m and K-4 200 m: both 1994), and a bronze (K-2 500 m: 1994).

References

German female canoeists
Living people
Year of birth missing (living people)
ICF Canoe Sprint World Championships medalists in kayak